The Mocha-Villarrica Fault Zone is a northwest-trending geological fault zone in southern Chile and Argentina. The fault zone runs from Mocha Island in the Pacific to the Andes where it aligns Villarrica, Quetrupillán and Lanín volcanoes. It is one of several fault zones that traverses the north-south Liquiñe-Ofqui Fault.

References

Thrust faults
Geology of Biobío Region
Geology of Araucanía Region
Geology of Los Ríos Region
Geology of Neuquén Province
Coasts of Biobío Region